Dominique Wacalie (born 14 August 1982) is a retired New Caledonian footballer who played as a midfielder. Since 2021, he managed the New Caledonia national football team.

External links
 
 

1982 births
Living people
New Caledonian footballers
New Caledonian football managers
New Caledonia national football team managers
New Caledonia international footballers
AS Magenta players
bourges 18 players
FC Déolois players
Association football midfielders
2012 OFC Nations Cup players